Kanumuri Bhagath Varma (born 21 September 1998) is an Indian cricketer. He made his T20 debut on 12 October 2022, for Hyderabad against Puducherry in the 2022–23 Syed Mushtaq Ali Trophy.

In February 2022, he was bought by the Chennai Super Kings in the auction for the 2022 Indian Premier League tournament.

References

1998 births
Living people
Hyderabad cricketers
Indian cricketers